Seven ships of the Royal Navy have been named HMS Mars, after Mars, the Roman god of war:
 The first Mars was a 50-gun ship, originally Dutch, captured in the Second Anglo-Dutch War in 1665, and sold in 1667.
She was wrecked in 1755 near Halifax, Nova Scotia.
 The third  was a 74-gun third rate, launched in 1759 and sold in 1784.
 The fourth  was a 32-gun fifth rate, originally Dutch, captured in the Fourth Anglo-Dutch War in 1781 in the West Indies, and sold in 1783. She became an East Indiaman but was wrecked in 1787 at the end of her first voyage for the British East India Company.
 The fifth , was a 74-gun third rate, launched in 1794. She took part in the Spithead mutiny in 1797 and the Battle of Trafalgar in 1805. She was broken up in 1823.
 The sixth , was an 80-gun second rate, launched in 1848, converted to screw propulsion, and sold in 1929. Between 1869 and 1929 she served as a training ship.
She served as a guardship and transport in World War I and was sold in 1921.
 Mars was to have been a  cruiser, but was cancelled in 1946.

See also
 
 , previously called 
 MARS tanker (Military Afloat Reach and Sustainability) project for the Royal Navy
 Mars (disambiguation)

References
 

Royal Navy ship names